Quade Gerald Taylor (born 11 December 1993) is an English footballer who plays for Dulwich Hamlet as a defender.

Career

Early career
Taylor joined Dulwich Hamlet's youth academy aged 16, in the summer of 2010, and spent seven months at the club before joining Crystal Palace in March 2011. In the summer of 2012, Taylor signed a two-year professional contract with Crystal Palace committing his future until the summer of 2014. In March 2014, Taylor signed a loan deal with Conference side Welling United that lasted a month. During his loan spell, Taylor made nine league appearances and scored one league goal. At the end of the 2013–14 season, Taylor was released by Crystal Palace along with 11 others.

Bolton Wanderers
In July 2014, Taylor signed a one-year professional contract with Championship side Bolton Wanderers. He became a regular in the reserve side appearing in 20 league games and this resulted in Taylor making his first-team debut on the last day of the 2014–15 season against Birmingham City which Bolton lost 1–0 and Taylor played the full 90 minutes of the match. He said after making his professional debut, "The Birmingham game was a bit crazy – it was all new and a bit daunting, but I personally felt as though it couldn't have gone any better aside from the result. I just felt really at home in the team. I didn't have any idea that I was going to be starting the game either – I was obviously included in the matchday squad, but I didn't find out until we were in the dressing room beforehand." After making his debut, Taylor was rewarded with a 12-month contract extension that kept him at the Macron Stadium until the summer of 2016.

In March 2016, he joined League Two side Dagenham & Redbridge on loan until the end of the season.

At the end of the 2015–16 season, the club confirmed that he would be leaving when his contract expired at the end of June.

Non-league
Following his release from Bolton Wanderers, Taylor signed for National League side Braintree Town in August 2016, following a trial period throughout the summer. Shortly after he arrived at the club, his contract was terminated and he had a short spell out of the game. In October 2016, he returned to former club Dulwich Hamlet of the Isthmian League Premier Division on a free transfer.

Career statistics

References

External links

 Quade Taylor at Dulwich Hamlet F.C.

1993 births
Living people
English footballers
Association football forwards
Footballers from Tooting
Dulwich Hamlet F.C. players
Crystal Palace F.C. players
Welling United F.C. players
Bolton Wanderers F.C. players
Dagenham & Redbridge F.C. players
Braintree Town F.C. players
English Football League players
National League (English football) players
Isthmian League players